Elops machnata, the tenpounder, is a species of ray-finned fish in the family Elopidae in the order Elopiformes (tarpons and tenpounders).  This species is found in coastal regions of the Indian Ocean.

Possible threats 
This species uses estuarine areas and hypersaline lagoons; changes in the quality of these habitats may affect this species' population dynamics.  Although this species may not be closely associated with any single habitat, it may be adversely affected by development and urbanization.

References

External links
 Australian Giant Herring @ Fishes of Australia

Elopidae
Marine fauna of East Africa
Marine fish of Western Australia
Fish described in 1775
Taxa named by Peter Forsskål